The 1999–2000 Euro Hockey Tour was the fourth season of the Euro Hockey Tour. The season consisted of four tournaments, the Česká Pojišťovna Cup, Karjala Tournament, Baltica Brewery Cup, and the Sweden Hockey Games. The games Canada participated in did not count towards the final standings of the tournament.

Tournaments

Česká Pojišťovna Cup

Karjala Tournament

Baltica Brewery Cup

Sweden Hockey Games

Final standings

References
Euro Hockey Tour website

Euro Hockey Tour
1999–2000 in European ice hockey
1999–2000 in Canadian ice hockey
1999–2000 in Russian ice hockey
1999–2000 in Czech ice hockey
1999–2000 in Swedish ice hockey
1999–2000 in Finnish ice hockey